Tropico 6 is a construction, management and  political simulation game in the Tropico series, developed by Limbic Entertainment, published by Kalypso Media, and announced at E3 2017. Originally intended for a 2018 release, Tropico 6 was released on Microsoft Windows, macOS and Linux in March 2019, and for PlayStation 4 and Xbox One in September 2019. It was released for the Nintendo Switch in November 2020, and on PlayStation 5 and Xbox Series X/S in March 2022.

Gameplay
As in the other games in the series, the player assumes the role of "El Presidente", the leader of the Caribbean island nation of Tropico. Similarly to Tropico 5, there are four eras: The Colonial era, the World Wars era, the Cold War era, and the modern era. Unlike previous games in the series, where Tropico consisted of only one island, Tropico 6 allows players to build on an archipelago of smaller islands, allowing players to build bridges (in the World Wars era and later) from their starting island to the other islands in the chain. According to senior content designer Johannes Pfeiffer, Tropico 6 has "fully simulated" citizens, where the actions of El Presidente's government towards the citizenry can have an effect on productivity, and possibly even result in a revolt. In addition to customizing their own El Presidente (as either male or female), players can also customize the presidential palace.

Reception

Tropico 6 received "generally positive views" for Windows, PlayStation 4, and Xbox One, while the Switch port received "mixed or average" reviews, according to review aggregator Metacritic. It was the fastest-selling game in the franchise, with the revenue it generated being 50% higher than that of Tropico 5'''s debut.

CGM called Tropico 6 the "strongest entry in the franchise", praising its music, graphics, and writing, while recognizing the presence of minor bugs and jank, ultimately deeming the title a full realization of the series' potential. Shacknews heavily lauded the "incredibly addictive" gameplay, crisp UI, sheer detail, variety of strategic options, and comedy, and expressed minor gripes with the repetitive music and sometimes convoluted main screen. Push Square called the console port "...one of PlayStation 4's best strategy games, and also one of its most unique...", praising its music, varied objectives, and fun gameplay, citing the lack of clarity in objective design as a "source of frustration". PC Gamer wrote, "If there's a downside to raids, it's that there's no major downside. Foreign powers have traditionally taken a dim view to piracy, but in this, a game that specifically pokes fun at international relations, it just doesn't come up...where the missions excel, however, it's in forcing you to take actions that can upset the delicate balance of economic growth". GameRevolution criticized the console port's controller support and said that the single-player mission modes "missed the point" and praised the sandbox mode and tone of the game. IGN stated, "The amount there is to do and the depth of its political mechanics make Tropico 6 stand out over its immediate predecessors...But drink too deeply of its perplexing economic systems and you may find yourself feeling a bit queasy." PCGamesN praised the game's tone for being able to politically commentate on the abuse of democracy through its gameplay mechanics while also calling the title "fun but forgettable".

The Switch port of the game opened to marginally less positive reception, with the subpar graphics drawing criticism. Nintendo Life, while reviewing this port, wrote, "Despite some irksome performance problems, occasionally inconsistent pacing and some rather rough visuals, the game is a lot of addictive fun to play and its cheerful ambience and compelling systems will keep you glued to your handheld".

Sales

The Nintendo Switch version of Tropico 6'' was the twenty-seventh bestselling retail game during its first week of release in Japan, with 4,368 physical copies being sold.

Accolades

Notes

References

External links
 

2019 video games
Business simulation games
City-building games
Cold War video games
Government simulation video games
Linux games
MacOS games
Multiplayer and single-player video games
Nintendo Switch games
PlayStation 4 games
Video games with Steam Workshop support
Tropico (series)
Unreal Engine games
Video games developed in Germany
Video games featuring protagonists of selectable gender
Video games set in the Caribbean
Video games set in a fictional country
Video games set on islands
Video games set on fictional islands
Windows games
Xbox One games